The third season of Workaholics premiered on Comedy Central May 29, 2012 and concluded on March 20, 2013. This season was split into two parts with each part consisting a total of 10 episodes. The first half aired on May 29 and concluded on July 29, 2012, while the second half aired on January 16 and concluded on March 20, 2013.

Cast

Main

Starring
Blake Anderson as Blake Henderson
Adam DeVine as Adam DeMamp
Anders Holm as Anders "Ders" Holmvik

Also starring
Jillian Bell as Jillian Belk
Erik Griffin as Montez Walker
Maribeth Monroe as Alice Murphy

Special guest
Tom Green as Himself

Recurring
Kyle Newacheck as Karl Hevachek

Guest
Rumer Willis as Lisa
Dan Auerbach & Patrick Carney of The Black Keys
Bruce McCulloch as Judge Darren Tibbles
William Atherton as Thor Holmvik
Tim Heidecker as Reverend Troy
Alex Borstein as Colleen Walker
Bill Stevenson as Bill
Robert Englund as Dr. TelAmeriCorp
Daniel Stern as Travis Rockne
Tyler Posey as Billy Belk
Lisa Loeb as Lisa
Sally Kellerman as Peggy
Jordan Peele as Mark
Josh Brener as Marshall Davis

Production
On October 25, 2011, Comedy Central renewed Workaholics for a third season at the time the show's second season was still airing.

Episodes

Notes

References

External links
 
 

2012 American television seasons
2013 American television seasons